Buton (also Butung, Boeton or Button) is an island in Indonesia located off the southeast peninsula of Sulawesi. It covers roughly 4,727 square kilometers in area, or about the size of Madura; it is the 129th largest island in the world and Indonesia's 19th largest in area.

History

In the precolonial era, the island, then usually known as Butung, was within the sphere of influence of Ternate. Especially in the sixteenth century, Buton served as an important secondary regional center within the Ternaten empire, controlling regional trade and collecting tribute to be sent to Ternate.

The Sultanate of Buton ruled over the island from the 14th until the 20th century.

Sultan Murhum, the first Islamic monarch on the island, is remembered in the name of the island's major harbor, Murhum Harbor, in Baubau.

Geography
Its largest town is Baubau, where the Wolio and Cia-Cia languages are spoken. Major nearby islands include Wawonii (to the north), Muna and Kabaena (to the west) and Siumpu (to the southwest). The Tukangbesi Islands lie just to the east where Tukang Besi is spoken, and is separated by the Gulf of Kolowana Watabo (Teluk Kolowana Watabo).

Batuatas Island is to the south.  Also the Bouton Passage (as it was known in the pre-Independence era) was an important inter-island navigational location of the northern Flores Sea.

Ecology
The island is largely covered by rainforest and is known for its wildlife.  It is one of only two habitats of the anoa, a type of  buffalo.

People 

The languages spoken on Buton include Wolio, Cia-Cia, various dialects of Muna, Tukang Besi, Kumbewaha, Lasalimu, Kamaru, Pancana, Busoa, Taloki, Kulisusu and Kioko.  The Indonesian language, the national language of Indonesia, is also widely used and taught in schools.

In 2009, the Cia-Cia tribe in Baubau city began to use the Korean Hangul alphabet for their language, based on textbooks created by the Hunminjeongeum Society, a linguistic society in Seoul., but in 2012 it was reported that adoption ultimately failed and has been abandoned.

Economy
The island has a massive reserve of natural asphalt and several other minerals. Asphalt from Buton can be utilized as bitumen modifiers  as well as a substitute for petroleum asphalt. As a result, natural asphalt can be used to reduce dependency on conventional fossil based resources.

Administration
Buton Island is administratively divided into five second level administrative divisions (Daerah Tingkat II): Baubau City, Buton Regency, (part of) South Buton Regency (which includes several smaller islands to the west and south of Buton), North Buton Regency and (part of) Muna Regency. 

However, the eponymous archipelago is administered under an additional four regencies: the rest of Muna Regency and South Buton Regency, together with West Muna Regency, Wakatobi Regency, Central Buton Regency (which does not include any portion of Buton Island), and (part of) Bombana Regency.

Notes

Islands of Sulawesi
Landforms of Southeast Sulawesi
Populated places in Indonesia